Konstantine Mukhranbatoni (died 1716) was a Georgian nobleman of the House of Mukhrani, a collateral branch of the royal Bagrationi dynasty of Kartli. He was Prince (batoni) of Mukhrani and ex officio commander of the Banner of Shida Kartli and Grand Master of the Household (msakhurt-ukhutsesi) at the court of Kartli from 1696 to 1700.

Konstantine was a son of Prince Teimuraz II of Mukhrani. He succeeded to the lordship of Mukhrani and court titles on the deposition of his uncle, Papua, who was punished by the pro-Iranian king Heraclius I for his loyalty to the rebellious George XI. Konstantine married Nino, daughter of Prince David Amilakhvari and had a son, Konstantine.

References

1716 deaths
House of Mukhrani
Year of birth unknown
17th-century people from Georgia (country)
18th-century people from Georgia (country)